Marcello Guarducci (born 11 July 1956) is an Italian former freestyle swimmer.

Biography
Guarducci won several gold medals in different editions of the Mediterranean Games. Guarducci participated in three Olympic Games editions reaching finals. Being part of a military athletic group, he missed the games of Moscow 1980 because of the boycott.

See also
 Italian record progression 50 metres freestyle
 Italian record progression 100 metres freestyle
 Italian record progression 200 metres freestyle
 Italian record progression 400 metres freestyle

References

External links
Agenda Diana, Marcello Guarducci page, medals and times 
Overview on Guarducci's career  

1956 births
Living people
Sportspeople from Trento
Italian male freestyle swimmers
Olympic swimmers of Italy
Swimmers at the 1972 Summer Olympics
Swimmers at the 1976 Summer Olympics
Swimmers at the 1984 Summer Olympics
World Aquatics Championships medalists in swimming
European Aquatics Championships medalists in swimming
Mediterranean Games gold medalists for Italy
Mediterranean Games silver medalists for Italy
Mediterranean Games bronze medalists for Italy
Swimmers at the 1975 Mediterranean Games
Swimmers at the 1979 Mediterranean Games
Swimmers at the 1983 Mediterranean Games
Universiade medalists in swimming
Mediterranean Games medalists in swimming
Universiade gold medalists for Italy
Swimmers of Centro Sportivo Carabinieri
Medalists at the 1979 Summer Universiade
20th-century Italian people